Santo Tomas, officially the City of Santo Tomas, is a 1st class component city in the province of Batangas, Philippines. According to the 2020 census, it has a population of 218,500 people.

With the continuous expansion of Metro Manila, the city is now part of Manila's conurbation which reaches Lipa in its southernmost part. It borders the cities of Calamba to the north, Los Baños to the north-east, Alaminos to the east, Tanauan and Malvar to the west, and Lipa to the south.

Santo Tomas is the hometown of Philippine Revolution and Philippine–American War hero Miguel Malvar, the last Filipino General to surrender to the Americans. On September 7, 2019, the Republic Act 11086, or the City Charter of Santo Tomas, was ratified on a plebiscite by the electorate of Santo Tomas.

The patron saint of Santo Tomas is Saint Thomas Aquinas, patron of Catholic schools whose feast day is celebrated every March 7.

History

Santo Tomas was founded in 1666, with Manuel Melo as its first head. Originally, it was composed of a large poblacion. When the Spanish friars arrived, their first and foremost objective was to construct a church near the river to satisfy their inclination for water. Thus, the present site of a Roman Catholic church was chosen near the San Juan River. As years went by, more houses were built around the church. This became the center of the poblacion.

Other groups of houses were scattered all over the area. They were given such odd names as "Kabaong", because of coffin-shaped stones along the road; "Putol" because the trail was cut short by Mount Makiling; "Aptayin", because "apta" or fine shrimps were found in the brook; "Biga", because biga trees abounded there; and "Camballao", as in "kambal" (twin) because twin rivers divided the place. These different unit groups comprised the barrios of the town.

The natives were by nature God-fearing, peaceful and obedient. Colonial officials did not much have difficulty enforcing decrees and orders. One such irrevocable decree was to change the original names of the barrios to the names of saints in the Catholic calendar and to place each them under its patrotonio; the former "Pook" and "Aptayin" were joined and called San Bartolome, "Kabaong" was changed to San Vicente, "Biga" to Santa Anastacia, and "Camballao" to San Isidro Sur and San Isidro Norte. The whole town was given the name of Santo Tomas de Aquino, after a saint of the Dominican Order to where most of the first friars belonged. As time went by, more barrios were added to the list each with an assumed name of a saint.

From the year 1666, the head of the town had different titles, variously known as captain from 1666 to 1782, alcalde from 1783 to 1788, gobernadorcillo from 1789 to 1821, presidente local from 1822 to 1899, presidente municipal from 1900 to 1930, and mayor from 1931 to present.

Cityhood

In 2015, Nelson P. Collantes, the then representative of Batangas's 3rd District, proposed a House bill to convert Santo Tomas into a component city. After few years, with a unanimous vote of 19–0, the Senate approved a bill for the municipality's conversion into a city on March 19, 2018. On October 5, 2018, President Rodrigo Duterte signed Republic Act No. 11086 or "An Act Converting the Municipality of Santo Tomas in the Province of Batangas into a Component City to be known as the City of Santo Tomas." It is the first municipality to be converted into a city under the Duterte administration, effectively ratified on September 7, 2019.

Geography

According to the Philippine Statistics Authority, the component city has a land area of  constituting  of the  total area of Batangas.

Barangays
Santo Tomas is politically subdivided into 30 barangays. Most of the barangays were named after saints.

Climate

Demographics

In the 2020 census, Santo Tomas had a population of 218,500.

Economy

The First Philippine Industrial Park which is owned by the Lopez Group of Companies is located in the city.

Most of the city is residential with a lot of farmland. There are also some developed subdivisions along the city like the San Antonio Heights in Barangay San Antonio which was developed by Avida Land, a division of Ayala Land, Camella Homes, and Terrazza de Santo Tomas in Barangay San Roque which was developed by Ovialand. The city is well known for an entire strip of bulalo (bone marrow soup) restaurants and to a hospital named Saint Cabrini Medical Center which is located inside the city center.

Aside from various real estate development in the city, Santo Tomas also has a popular lifestyle and commercial complex in the locality. The AGOJO-Lifestyle Strip located in the Central Business District (CBD) along Maharlika Highway houses various restaurants, coffee shops, salons, clothing boutiques, videoke bars, fitness gym, and automotive services. Popular restaurants and coffee shops include both international brands and home grown establishments. AllHome Santo Tomas and Liana's Junction Santo Tomas are known shopping destinations that operate in the city. SM City Santo Tomas, a future SM Supermall, is under construction along Maharlika Highway.

Transportation

Roads
The Pan-Philippine Highway or Maharlika Highway connects the city with Calamba, the rest of Laguna, with the highway reaching as far as Bicol Region. The Southern Tagalog Arterial Road (STAR Tollway) and South Luzon Expressway start at the city connects the city with Batangas City and Metro Manila, respectively. The Jose P. Laurel Highway connects the city with Tanauan City, Lipa and Batangas City.

Public transport
Jeepneys (Filipino: "dyip") connect the city with Calamba to the north, Tanauan to the south, and San Pablo to the east. Buses from Manila to Batangas City, Lucena, or Bicol serve the city. UV Express service also connects Santo Tomas with San Pablo, Santa Rosa, Lipa, and Dasmariñas. Tricycles provide transportation within the barangays.

Government

 Mayor:  Arth Jhun A. Marasigan
 Vice Mayor:  Catherine J. Perez
 Councilors:
 Ross Allan D. Maligaya
 Leovino M. Villegas
 Raquel M. Maloles-Salazar
 Danilo P. Mabilangan
 Arlene F. Manebo
 Arturo U. Pecaña
 Gerardo M. Malijan
 Helengrace P. Navarro
 Victor O. Bathan
 Adrian C. Carpio
 ABC president: Ladislao M.  Malijan
 SK Federation President: Kirby S. Palla

Education

Universities

The Polytechnic University of the Philippines has one campus in Santo Tomas. It is a constituent branch of the PUP System and the only institution of higher learning in Santo Tomas that serves the city and neighboring cities.

High schools
The city has 4 public high schools.

 San Jose National High School
 San Pedro National High School
 Santa Clara National High School
 Santa Anastacia-San Rafael National High School

Public schools
There are 28 public elementary schools within Santo Tomas.

Santo Tomas North District

A. Zone 1
 Santo Tomas North Central School
 San Roque Elementary School
 Santa Cruz Elementary School

B. Zone 2
 San Antonio Elementary School
 Santiago Elementary School
 Santa Anastacia Elementary School

C. Zone 3
 Doña Tiburcia Carpio Malvar Elementary School
 San Bartolome Elementary School
 San Vicente Elementary School

Santo Tomas South District

A. Zone 4
 Santo Tomas South Central School (formerly San Pedro Elementary School)
 San Francisco Elementary School
 San Isidro Elementary School
 Santa Elena Elementary School
 Santa Maria Elementary School

B. Zone 5
 San Agustin Elementary School
 San Bartolome Elementary School
 San Felix Elementary School
 San Jose Elementary School
 San Juan Elementary School
 San Pablo Elementary School
 Santa Ana Elementary School

C. Zone 6
 San Fernando Elementary School
 San Joaquin Elementary School
 San Luis Elementary School
 Santa Clara Elementary School
 Santa Teresita Elementary School

Private schools
There are 18 private schools within the Santo Tomas.

 Almond Academy Foundation Inc.
 AMS Learning School
 Blue Isle Integrated School
 Clareville School
 Elyon Academia Foundation, Inc.
 Greenville Academy of Santa Clara
 His Care Learning Center of Santa Maria
 Hope Christian Academy of Santo Tomas
 Kids for Jesus Academy Inc.
 Maranatha Christian Academy of Santo Tomas
 Maranatha Christian Academy of Blue Isle
 Mother Barbara Micarelli School
 Nikiesha's Interactive Camp Child Development Center Inc.
 Pedagogia Children's School (Santo Tomas)
 San Bartolome Adventist Elementary School
 Saint Thomas Academy
 Saint Thomas Montessori Learning Center
 The Golden Child Literacy Place

Mythology
In Philippine mythology, the homeland of the anggitays is believed to be somewhere in Santo Tomas, Batangas. The anggitays are creatures resembling centaurs but have a single horn on the forehead and are generally female.

Notable personalities

Miguel Malvar – Filipino revolutionary general.
Vinci Malizon – member of P-Pop group Hori7on.

References

External links

 
 [ Philippine Standard Geographic Code]
 Santo Tomas, Batangas Wordpress

 
1666 establishments in the Philippines
Component cities in the Philippines
Cities in Batangas